Pierre Albéric Second, (17 June 1817  - 2 June 1887 ) was a 19th-century French journalist, novelist and playwright.

Biography 
The son of a magistrate, Second felt no taste for law and began a literary career. He was successively assistant at Le Charivari, director of l'Entr'acte, co-founder of la Comédie parisienne, editor at Le Figaro, founder of Le Grand Journal with Hippolyte de Villemessant, and columnist at l'Événement before he took over the management of l’Entr’acte in 1870.

During a short period between 1848 and 1850, Second was sub-prefect of the Basses-Alpes department at Castellane. Awarded the Legion of honour in 1859, he was Imperial commissioner of the Théâtre de l'Odéon from 1865 to 1870. In 1869, Second was commissioned to write the words of the cantata sung at the Opera in honor of the centenary of Napoleon, which is remarkable only for its flat mediocrity.

Gifted with a light spirit, a fun and easy skill, Second was especially appreciated for his columns. During the Revolution of 1848, he composed a cantata in which each stanza ended with these lines:

Charles Monselet wrote this portrait of him:

Main publications 

1841: Lettres cochinchinoises sur les hommes et les choses du jour écrites à l'empereur de la Chine par trois Mandarins de première classe, traduites par Albéric Second, orientaliste du Charivari
1842: Les Mémoires d'un poisson rouge
1844: Les Petits Mystères de l'Opéra, illustrated by Paul Gavarni
1845: Histoire politique et culinaire de Joseph Sansot, Propriétaire de l'Hôtel de la Paix
1853: La Jeunesse dorée par le procédé Ruolz
1854: Contes sans prétention 
1855: La Part du feu
1856: À quoi tient l'amour, fantaisies parisiennes 
1856: Les Demoiselles du Ronçay 
1860: Paris au jour le jour, with Hippolyte de Villemessant (2 volumes)
1862: Vichy-Sévigné, Vichy-Napoléon, ses eaux, ses embellissements, ses environs, son histoire, suivi d'une notice scientifique et médicale sur les eaux minérales de Vichy par le Dr Casimir Daumas 
1868: Misères d'un prix de Rome 
1872: Un dîner chez Brébant 
1872: La Semaine des quatre jeudis
1877: À la recherche d'un gendre 
1879: Le Roman de deux bourgeois
1886: Le Tiroir aux souvenirs 
Theatre
1836: Trichemont fils, vaudeville in 1 act, with Marc Michel, Théâtre d'Angoulême, 29 September
1839: Un dragon de vertu, folie-vaudeville in 1 act, with Marc Michel, Paris, Théâtre des Folies-Dramatiques, 27 July 
1839: Un neveu, s'il vous plaît, folie-vaudeville in 1 act, with Émile Pagès, Paris, Théâtre de l'Ambigu-Comique, 14 October 
1842: La Peur du mal, comedy in 1 act, mixed with distincts, with Armand-Numa Jautard, Paris, Théâtre de l'Ambigu-Comique, 31 March 
1842: Le Droit d'aînesse, comédie en vaudevilles in 2 acts, with Louis Lurine, Paris, Théâtre des Délassements-Comiques, 13 August 
1854: La Comédie à Ferney, comedy in 1 act and in prose, with Louis Lurine, Paris, Théâtre-Français, 15 July 
1855: English spoken, vaudeville in 1 act, with Auguste Joltrois, Paris, Théâtre du Palais-Royal, 7 July
1869: Une vendetta parisienne, comedy in 1 act, in prose, Paris, Théâtre du Vaudeville, 11 February
1869: La Fontaine de Berny, opéra comique en 1 acte, music by Adolphe Nibelle, Paris, Théâtre de l'Opéra-Comique, 2 June
1872: Un maître en service, comedy in 1 act, with Jules Blerzy, Paris, Théâtre du Gymnase, 8 September 
1875: Un mouton à l'entresol, comedy in 1 act, with Eugène Labiche, Paris, Théâtre du Palais-Royal, 30 April
1878: Un baiser anonyme, comedy in 1 act and in prose, with Jules Blerzy, Comédie-Française
1882: La Vicomtesse Alice, drama in 5 acts and 8 tableaux, with Léon Beauvallet, Paris, Théâtre des Nations, 28 September 
1883: La Vie facile, comedy in 3 acts, with Paul Ferrier, Paris, Théâtre du Vaudeville, 19 May 
1885: Coup de soleil, comedy in 1 act, with Théodore de Grave, Paris, Théâtre de l'Odéon, 28 October

References

Sources 
Camille Dreyfus, La Grande Encyclopédie, inventaire raisonné des sciences, des lettres et des arts, 1885-1902, vol. XXIX, p. 859.
Pierre Larousse, Grand Dictionnaire universel du XIXe siècle, vol. XIV, 1875, p. 451-452.

19th-century French journalists
French male journalists
19th-century French dramatists and playwrights
Writers from Angoulême
1817 births
1887 deaths
19th-century French male writers